The Towpath Marathon is a  marathon race held each October on the Towpath Trail located in Cuyahoga Valley National Park in Northeast Ohio. A half-marathon and 10K race are held in conjunction with the marathon.  In 2009 the Towpath Marathon had the 18th highest percentage of participants to qualify for the Boston Marathon with 98 runners, or 20.7%, qualifying.

The course 

The course begins on Riverview Road just to the north of the Boston Mills Ski Resort.  Runners head south until they come to Boston Mill Road where they run east until they enter the Towpath Trail, a distance of approximately 0.5 miles.  Runners head south along the trail for roughly seven miles, turn around at the Ira Road Trailhead parking lot and then run back north for 13 miles.  Just north of the Station Road Bridge the runners again reverse direction and head south for six miles until they reach the finish line at the Boston Store.

Runner's World magazine has described the race as “one of the most beautiful race courses in America”.

History 
The first Towpath Marathon was held in 1992 as part of the ceremonies to inaugurate the Towpath Trail and the Ohio and Erie Canalway in Cuyahoga Valley National Park.  An average of 1,200 participants take part in this annual event.

Course records 
Male – 2:27:59
Female - 2:50:42

References 

Marathons in the United States
Sports competitions in Ohio
Tourist attractions in Cuyahoga County, Ohio
Tourist attractions in Summit County, Ohio
Recurring sporting events established in 1992
Sports in Summit County, Ohio
Sports in Cuyahoga County, Ohio